George McKee may refer to:
George McKee (Medal of Honor) (died 1892), American Civil War Medal of Honor recipient
George C. McKee (1837–1890), U.S. Representative from Mississippi
 George H. McKee (1923–2015), American Air Force lieutenant general

See also
George Mackey (1916–2006), American mathematician